Canticum Canticorum (Song of Solomon) from 1584 is a cycle of 29 motets by  Giovanni Pierluigi da Palestrina. Originally titled Motettorum - Liber Quartus, this  Renaissance work is one of Palestrina's largest collections of Sacred motets.

The work is in Latin and based upon excerpts from the book in the Song of Songs of the Old Testament. The Song of Songs is thought to be an allegorical representation of the relationship of God and the faithful as husband and wife. The text uses the main image of a man and wife almost throughout, the poem suggesting movement from courting to consummation.

Palestrina's setting of the text is scored for 5 voices: SATTB (1 - 18, 29), SAATB (19 - 22, 27 - 28), and  SSATB (23 - 26); and was published, after revision, by Breitkopf and Härtel in the collection Palestrina Werke, vol. 4.

History 

Canticum Canticorum was written in the year 1584. This work, as with many of Palestrina's works around this time, was dedicated to Pope Gregory XIII. The work can, however, also be seen as a social statement which challenged what music was commonly accepted in the church at the time.

It is assumed that during its composition, he kept in mind that other church composers had lost their jobs for composing madrigals, and he, also being guilty of this fault, would ‘repent’ by composing music that celebrates divine love. His illustration of passion in this piece exceeds that of any of his other sacred works. Through the work, Palestrina insists upon the independence of musicians, firstly through the composition thereof, and secondly through admitting awareness of what he has created - a musical setting of profane love songs, but ultimately a celebration of divine love. Palestrina famously declared: "Sic enim rem ipsam postulare intelligebam" - indicating that he realised that he was creating something new which may not be suitable for use in the church. He did, however, continue to refer to the motets as sacred.

Structure 

The entire piece forms a dramatic lyric consisting of a series of individual motets. The work is also divided into larger sections, or episodes, distinguishable by mode. It is often questioned whether the motets were designed to be performed as a whole or separately, although it seems Palestrina attempted to arrange the text according to coherence and climax - strong evidence that the work is of a single design.

By grouping the motets together in modes, there is a sense of dramatic unity. Palestrina did not use the biblical verses in their original order, but arranged them to achieve a dramatic context. Motets 1 to 10 are in the G Dorian mode. The third motet ends with the lyrics “they made me the keeper of the vineyards”, while motet 4 opens with the text “but mine own vineyard have I not kept”. Motet 4 then continues with a question which is in turn answered in motet 5.
The entire work is set up in this way, one motet connecting to the next -  telling a story that continues until the end of the first episode (motet 10). The following episodes continue with the same dramatic development. Episode 2 (in G Mixolydian) ends unexpectedly with the use of a single motet in the Hypoaolian mode, the only one in the collection (motet 19). The final 2 episodes are in the E Phrygian mode and F Ionian mode respectively.

The Motets are organized in the collection as follows:

Analysis 

The work is in five-part polyphony, which was considered undramatic at the time. Therefore, some writers emphasised that if Palestrina intended for these motets to be a single quasi-dramatic work then the textual content would not have been set to five-part polyphony. On the other hand, Palestrina was deeply rooted in traditional polyphony, questioning the value of that claim. Nevertheless, the polyphony itself forms an important element in the work - for example, in motet XIX, Palestrina makes use of polyphony to individualise the Lover. She asks the Daughters of Jerusalem about her lover and they reply. The polyphony symbolises the crowd, as well as expressing the Lover as an individual.

Palestrina was restricted by the musical practices of his day. It was common for him and his contemporaries to overcome this obstacle by creating very long pieces that can be divided into shorter works, each clearly distinguishable by their episodic character. A unity was created by building the work at large around a specific theme. No form of the time was suited to anything as large as even the first 10 motets, which form the first episode of this work.

Stylistically the individual pieces are in fact a combination of the madrigal and the motet. The texture is notably tighter than those typically found  in motets or masses of the time. There is also a powerful, passionate tone throughout the work, distinguishing it from others of its time.

Notes 

Compositions by Giovanni Pierluigi da Palestrina
1584 compositions
Motets